Philip Andrews (30 March 1866 – 18 December 1935) was a United States Navy officer during World War I who later became admiral.

Early life and career
Andrews was born in New York City, and was appointed to the United States Naval Academy in 1882. He graduated on 1886 and, after the required two years of sea duty on board USS Brooklyn and USS Pensacola, was commissioned ensign in 1888. He was transferred to the USS Chicago in 1891. He also served on USS Raleigh, USS Newark, USS Columbia and other ships, before being transferred to South Bethlehem where he was Inspector of Ordnance from 1898 to 1899.

After more sea duty, he assumed his first command, the armed tug USS Wompatuck in 1901. The tug was transferred to the Philippines via the Mediterranean Sea and the Suez Canal under his command and provided support for US troops in the Philippine–American War. Andrews became the navigator on USS New Orleans in late 1902. He was promoted to the rank of Commander in 1909. In 1912 he was appointed Chief of the Bureau of Navigation with the temporary rank of Rear Admiral. With his transfer a year later, he got his old rank of commander back and was promoted to Captain in 1913 and commanded USS Montana. In 1904 he took command on USS Maryland. From 1917 to 1918 he was a staff member of the Fifth Naval District in Norfolk, Virginia. In January 1918 he became captain of the battleship USS Mississippi.

He was promoted to full rear admiral in 1919 and became commander of the US Naval Base in Cardiff. After the war he was transferred back to the US, but in June 1923 was appointed Commander of the US Naval Forces in Europe and was promoted to vice admiral.

In 1925 he became Commandant of the First Naval District and held that position until his retirement in June 1930.

Philip Andrews died on 18 December 1935 in San Diego.

References
 Biography on www.history.navy.mil

External links

1866 births
1935 deaths
Military personnel from New York City
United States Naval Academy alumni
United States Navy personnel of the Spanish–American War
United States Navy personnel of World War I
United States Navy vice admirals
Recipients of the Navy Distinguished Service Medal
Burials at Arlington National Cemetery